Pontianak State Museum (Museum Negeri Pontianak) is a museum in Pontianak, West Kalimantan, Indonesia, near Tanjungpura University. 

The concrete reliefs on the museum's exterior depict the lifestyles of Kalbar's two largest ethnic minorities: Malay and Dayak.  The museum contains a number of important Dayak artifacts such as tribal clothing and handicrafts and is known for its 16th century tempayan (water jugs). from Thailand, China and Borneo. There is a replica of a Dayak longboat around the corner from the museum.

References

Museums in Indonesia
Buildings and structures in Pontianak
Ethnographic museums in Indonesia
Tourist attractions in West Kalimantan